Serbian Honour (Srbske časti) is a Russian-trained and -funded Serbian ultranationalist, russophilic, irredentist, islamophobic and paramilitary organization organization in Republika Srpska, Bosnia and Herzegovina, acting in support of separatist leader Milorad Dodik.

Leadership
One of the group's leaders includes Bojan Stojković, a former Serbian paratrooper.

References

Organizations based in Republika Srpska
Paramilitary organizations based in Bosnia and Herzegovina
 
Serbian nationalism in Bosnia and Herzegovina
 
Far-right politics in Europe